Playroom, also known as Brill's Playroom or Hubert Brill's Playroom, is an American television series that aired on the now-defunct DuMont Television Network on Fridays at 7 p.m. (Eastern time) from January 9 to May 28, 1948.

The host, Brooklyn-born Hubert Brill, was a member of the Society of American Magicians and known for playing a minor role in the movie Out Of The Past (1947), which immediately preceded his run on Playroom.

Sponsor magazine described the program as a family variety show featuring "talented guests from the entertainment world."

Playroom was a "sustaining" feature on the DuMont network, attracting no sponsors during its brief run.

See also
List of programs broadcast by the DuMont Television Network
List of surviving DuMont Television Network broadcasts

References

Bibliography
David Weinstein, The Forgotten Network: DuMont and the Birth of American Television (Philadelphia: Temple University Press, 2004) 
Alex McNeil, Total Television, Fourth edition (New York: Penguin Books, 1980) 
Tim Brooks and Earle Marsh, The Complete Directory to Prime Time Network TV Shows, Third edition (New York: Ballantine Books, 1964)

External links
DuMont historical website

1948 American television series debuts
1948 American television series endings
1940s American children's television series
Black-and-white American television shows
DuMont Television Network original programming
English-language television shows
Lost television shows